Behali Assembly constituency is one of the 126 assembly constituencies of Assam Legislative Assembly. Behali forms part of the Tezpur Lok Sabha constituency.

Town Details

 Country: India
 State: Assam
 District:  Biswanath district
 Lok Sabha Constituency: Tezpur Lok Sabha/Parliamentary constituency
 Assembly Categorisation: Rural
 Literacy Level: 80.0%
 Eligible Electors as per 2021 General Elections: 1,25,406 Eligible Electors. Male Electors:63,703. Female Electors: 61,703
 Geographic Co-Ordinates: 26°50'15.7"N 93°18'21.6"E
 Total Area Covered: 639 square kilometres
 Area Includes: Behali thana [excluding Halem and Brohmajan (Part) mouzas] and Baghmara (Part) mouza in Sootea thana in Tezpur sub-division., of Biswanath district of Assam
 Inter State Border : Biswanath
 Number Of Polling Stations: Year 2011-145,Year 2016-145,Year 2021-77

Members of Legislative Assembly 

Following is the list of past members from constituency to Assam Legislative Assembly:

 1978: Bishnulal Upadhyaya, Indian National Congress.
 1985: Swarup Upadhyaya, Indian National Congress.
 1991: Barnabash Tanti, Indian National Congress.
 1996: Barnabash Tanti, Indian National Congress.
 2001: Ranjit Dutta, Bharatiya Janata Party.
 2006: Ranjit Dutta, Bharatiya Janata Party.
 2011: Pallab Lochan Das, Indian National Congress.
 2016: Ranjit Dutta, Bharatiya Janata Party.

Election results

2021 result

2016 result

2011 result

References

External links 
 

Assembly constituencies of Assam